Jeffrey Scott Schaefer (born May 31, 1960 in Patchogue, New York) is an American former professional baseball utility infielder. Of the 225 games Schaefer played in the majors, about half (110) were at shortstop, with most of the rest at third base (81) or second base (25).

Schaefer was inducted into the Suffolk Sports Hall of Fame on Long Island, New York, in the Baseball Category with the Class of 2010.

External links

1960 births
Living people
Albuquerque Dukes players
American expatriate baseball players in Canada
Baseball players from New York (state)
Bluefield Orioles players
Calgary Cannons players
Charlotte Knights players
Charlotte O's players
Chicago White Sox players
Hagerstown Suns players
Major League Baseball infielders
Midland Angels players
Oakland Athletics players
People from Patchogue, New York
Rochester Red Wings players
San Antonio Dodgers players
Seattle Mariners players
Tacoma Tigers players
Vancouver Canadians players
Maryland Terrapins baseball players